African mantis and African praying mantis are common names for many species of praying mantis native to Africa.

The following genera and species are often referred to by these names, by variants of them, or by common names including the name of an African nation:
 Miomantis
 Miomantis caffra — South African mantis
 Oxyothespis
 Oxyothespis dumonti — African grass mantis 
 Popa
 Popa spurca — African twig mantis 
 Sphodromantis
 Sphodromantis belachowski
 Sphodromantis centralis 
 Sphodromantis gastrica
 Sphodromantis lineola
 Sphodromantis viridis — Giant African mantis.
 Tarachodes — African bark mantis

See also 

 Mantis
 The Mantodea of Africa
 List of mantis genera and species

References 

01
insects of Africa
Mantis
lists of insects
Mantodea by location